An Chan-gi (born April 6, 1998) is a South Korean footballer who plays as a goalkeeper for K3 League side Cheongju FC on loan from Suwon Samsung Bluewings. He competed at the 2020 Summer Olympics.

References

External links
 

Suwon Samsung Bluewings players
K League 1 players
South Korean footballers
Association football goalkeepers
South Korea under-23 international footballers
Olympic footballers of South Korea
Footballers at the 2020 Summer Olympics
Incheon National University alumni
Place of birth missing (living people)
1998 births
Living people